Catlettsburg may refer to:

 Catlettsburg, Kentucky
 Catlettsburg, Tennessee